126th may refer to:

126th (Peel) Battalion, CEF, a unit in the Canadian Expeditionary Force during the First World War
126th Air Refueling Squadron, a unit of the Wisconsin Air National Guard that flies the KC-135R Stratotanker
126th Air Refueling Wing, an Illinois Air National Guard air refueling wing located at Scott Air Force Base, Illinois.
126th Baluchistan Infantry, a regiment of the British Indian Army
126th Cavalry Regiment (United States), a United States military unit of the Michigan Army National Guard
126th Delaware General Assembly, a meeting of the Delaware Senate and the Delaware House of Representatives
126th Division (People's Republic of China), a division deployed by the People's Republic of China
126th meridian east, a line of longitude 126° east of Greenwich
126th meridian west, a line of longitude 126° west of Greenwich
126th Ohio Infantry, an infantry regiment in the Union Army during the American Civil War
126th Pennsylvania Infantry, an infantry regiment of the Union Army of the American Civil War
126th Regiment of Foot, an infantry regiment of the British Army, created in 1794 and disbanded in 1796
Ohio 126th General Assembly, the legislative body of the state of Ohio in the years 2005 and 2006
Ohio House of Representatives membership, 126th General Assembly, in session in 2005 and 2006

See also
126 (number)
AD 126, the year 126 (CXXVI) of the Julian calendar
126 BC